María del Cisne Rivera Álvarez (born April 27, 1996 in Cuenca) is an Ecuadorian model, winner of the Miss Teen Earth 2012.

Miss Teen Earth 2012 
After winning the Señorita Festejos 2012 title in Bucay, Ecuador, Rivera was crowned Miss Teen Americas Ecuador 2012 at the Grand Hotel Guayaquil, chosen by Rodrigo Moreira.

She travelled El Salvador to represent Ecuador and won the Best National Costume.

Rivera was chosen as the first Miss Teen Earth Ecuador and she earned the right to represent her country Ecuador in the Miss Teen Earth pageant.

She was crowned Miss Teen Earth on September 15 in Guayaquil, Ecuador, where seventeen contestants from all over the world took part in the competition. She wore a white evening gown with Swarovski crystals, which was hand-embroidered.

Charity work
She cooperates to several charity foundations and street children in her community.

See also
Rodrigo Moreira

References

1996 births
Living people
People from Cuenca, Ecuador
Ecuadorian female models
Ecuadorian beauty pageant winners
21st-century Ecuadorian women